Umbraculum, common name the "umbrella slugs" is a genus of unusual sea snails or false limpets, marine gastropod molluscs in the family Umbraculidae.

Species
There are probably only two species in the genus Umbraculum.
 Umbraculum ovale (Carpenter, 1856)
 Umbraculum umbraculum (Lightfoot, 1786) - Atlantic umbrella slug.

Other synonymised taxa 
 Umbraculum bermudense (Mörch, 1875): synonym of Umbraculum umbraculum (Lightfoot, 1786)
 Umbraculum botanicum (Hedley, 1923): synonym of Umbraculum umbraculum (Lightfoot, 1786)
 Umbraculum indicum (Lamarck, 1819): synonym of Umbraculum umbraculum (Lightfoot, 1786)
 Umbraculum mediterraneum (Lamarck, 1819): synonym of Umbraculum umbraculum (Lightfoot, 1786)
 Umbraculum ovalis (Carpenter, 1856): synonym of Umbraculum umbraculum (Lightfoot, 1786)
 Umbraculum plicatulum (Martens, 1881): synonym of Umbraculum umbraculum (Lightfoot, 1786)
 Umbraculum pulchrum (Lin, 1981): synonym of Umbraculum umbraculum (Lightfoot, 1786)
 Umbrella indica (Lamarck, 1819): synonym of Umbraculum umbraculum (Lightfoot, 1786)
 Umbrella mediterranea (Lamarck, 1819): synonym of Umbraculum umbraculum (Lightfoot, 1786)
 Umbraculum rushii Dall, 1889: synonym of Plesiothyreus rushii (Dall, 1889)
 Umbraculum sinicum (Gmelin, 1791): synonym of Umbraculum umbraculum (Lightfoot, 1786)

References

 Vaught, K.C. (1989). A classification of the living Mollusca. American Malacologists: Melbourne, FL (USA). . XII, 195 pp
 Gofas, S.; Le Renard, J.; Bouchet, P. (2001). Mollusca, in: Costello, M.J. et al. (Ed.) (2001). European register of marine species: a check-list of the marine species in Europe and a bibliography of guides to their identification. Collection Patrimoines Naturels, 50: pp. 180–213
 Wägele H., Vonnemann V. & Rudman W.B. (2006) Umbraculum umbraculum (Lightfoot, 1786) (Gastropoda, Opisthobranchia, Tylodinoidea) and the synonymy of U. mediterraneum (Lamarck, 1812). Records of the Western Australian Museum Supplement 69: 69-8

Umbraculidae
Gastropod genera